Jacques Viger (November 23, 1735 – January 21, 1798) was a political figure in Lower Canada.

Biography 

He was born in Montreal on November 23, 1735, the son of the shoemaker Jacques Viger. On May 7, 1764, he married Amaranthe Prévost, the daughter of Eustache Prévost and Marie-Madeleine Sarrault.

In 1796, Jacques Viger was elected to the 2nd Parliament of Lower Canada for Kent County (later Chambly County) as a supporter of the parti canadien. His brother Denis Viger was also elected to the legislative assembly in Montreal East. He died on January 21, 1798.

His son, Jacques Viger, was the first mayor of Montreal and his nephew Louis-Michel Viger became a lawyer and also served in the Legislative Assembly of Lower Canada. His nephew Denis-Benjamin later played an important role in the politics of the province.

External links 

1735 births
1798 deaths
Members of the Legislative Assembly of Lower Canada
People from Montreal